Island Gardens is a public park located at the southern end of the Isle of Dogs in the London Borough of Tower Hamlets on the north bank of the River Thames. The park was formally opened on 3 August 1895 by local politician Will Crooks.

The  waterside park is notable for its cross-river view of the classical buildings of the former Greenwich Hospital, the Cutty Sark and the National Maritime Museum, with Greenwich Park forming a backdrop. The northern entrance of the Greenwich foot tunnel is also within the park. It is almost certain that the view from this location is the one that the Canaletto painting "Greenwich Hospital from the North Bank of the Thames" is taken from, though whether Canaletto himself actually visited the site is in doubt.

The park also gave its name to Island Gardens DLR station. This opened in 1987 as the southern terminus of the DLR's initial system, and was an elevated terminal station situated to the west of the park. The new station is largely underground; the original elevated station was demolished.

References 

Parks and open spaces in the London Borough of Tower Hamlets
Parks and open spaces on the River Thames
Millwall